Remixd is the second EP and first remix project from the Christian music duo Capital Kings. The material for the release was derived from their  debut album, which comes with six songs that are remixed from the debut album. It also features new song "Be a King".

Critical reception

Remixd got three positive reviews from critics. At New Release Tuesday, Sarah Fine rated the album four stars out of five, remarking how the release comes "With strong moments that heavily overshadow any weak spots, this is a fantastic EP that displays bold artistry, and highlights all the reasons why this band is so unique in the first place." Rich Smith of Louder Than the Music rated the album four stars out of five, calling it a "thoroughly enjoyable" effort, which is "fantastic and extremely well put together" because the listeners "are left with what sounds like a completely new album, refreshing already brilliant songs." At 365 Days of Inspiring Media, Joshua Andre rated the album three-and-a-half stars out of five, writing how it is a "fine effort".

Track listing

References 

2014 EPs
Capital Kings albums